Quezon Memorial station is an under-construction Manila Metro Rail Transit (MRT) station situated on Line 7 and the proposed Line 8. It is located within the Quezon Memorial Circle, Quezon City.

Close landmarks include the Ninoy Aquino Parks and Wildlife Center, Department of Agriculture Building, Quezon City Hall, Department of Agrarian Reform Building, the National Housing Authority (Philippines) and PTV Complex.

History 
The groundbreaking ceremony for the Manila Metro Rail Transit System Line 7 took place at the site of the Quezon Memorial station on April 20, 2016.

During development of the station, the Quezon City government suspends above-ground construction on February 18, 2020 as the proposed structure is claimed to damage the park's integrity. The current space for construction is more than five times the indicated 4,997 square meters. Mayor Joy Belmonte ordered a temporary cease and desist order on the above-ground construction of the station. Belmonte then discussed the issue with San Miguel Corporation, EEI Corporation, and the Department of Transportation for further clarification. At that time there was still no major above-ground structures at the site with most of the construction work still taking place underground. The design of the above-ground structure for the station was also still in the finalization phase.

The initial design of the station was approved as far back as the term of former Quezon City Mayor Herbert Bautista. It was also planned that a 2,500-square meter establishment would be constructed above-ground and it would expand to 11,000 square meters. On February 28, 2020, authorities from San Miguel Corporation and EEI Corporation presented a revised design of the above-ground area of the station consisting of only a utility room. It reduced almost 11,000 square meters to 426 square meters, and the height from 12 meters to 6 meters. Belmonte lifted the temporary cease and desist order on the same day.

References

External links
Proposed Quezon Memorial MRT Station

Manila Metro Rail Transit System stations
Railway stations under construction in the Philippines